The Ezekiel B. Zimmerman Octagon House is an historic octagonal house located in Marshallville, Ohio. It was built in 1883 by Ezekiel B. Zimmerman. For more information please visit the links below.

On May 28, 1975, it was added to the National Register of Historic Places.

See also
 List of Registered Historic Places in Ohio, Wayne County
  Zimmerman Bury Octagon House Website
 The Zimmerman Bury Octagon House Association is also on Facebook

References

Houses completed in 1883
Houses on the National Register of Historic Places in Ohio
Houses in Wayne County, Ohio
National Register of Historic Places in Wayne County, Ohio
Octagon houses in Ohio